James Stuart Olson is an academic and Pulitzer Prize-nominated author. In 1994, he was appointed Distinguished Professor of History at Sam Houston State University in Huntsville, Texas.

Olson is the author (or co-author) of over thirty books, primarily non-fiction, and usually in the field of History. His most recent book was Bathsheba’s Breast: Women, Cancer, and History, which won the 2002 History of Science Category Award from the Association of American Publishers. Olson wrote the book while suffering a malignant growth which resulted in the amputation of his hand. The book was recognized by the Los Angeles Times as one of the best non-fiction books in America for 2002. In November 2008, Olson was honored by his alma mater, Brigham Young University, with its Distinguished Alumni Service Award.

Education 
B.A., Brigham Young University
M.A., Ph.D., The State University of New York at Stony Brook

Works
Native Americans in the Twentieth Century (Brigham Young University Press)
Slave Life in America: A Historiography and Selected Bibliography (University Press of America)
The Ethnic Dimension in American History (St. Martin’s Press);
Saving Capitalism: The Reconstruction Finance Corporation and the New Deal, 1933-1940 (Princeton University Press);
Catholic Immigrants in America (Nelson-Hall);
Winning is the Only Thing: Sports in America Since 1945 (The Johns Hopkins University Press);
Where the Domino Fell: America and Vietnam, 1945 to 1990

 etc.

Students 
Harold Lee Wise – Author of Inside the Danger Zone:The U.S. Military in the Persian Gulf, 1987–1988 (Naval Institute Press, 2007)

References

External links 
Olson's homepage at SHSU

American Latter Day Saints
American non-fiction writers
Brigham Young University alumni
Living people
Stony Brook University alumni
1946 births